Bernard O'Higgins (?–1564) was an Irish Roman Catholic bishop.  He served as the Bishop of Elphin from 1542 to 1564.

References

1564 deaths
Roman Catholic bishops of Elphin
Year of birth unknown